Halfpenny is a hamlet in the civil parish of Stainton, in the South Lakeland district, in the county of Cumbria, England. It is located roughly two and a half miles south east of Kendal. There is notably a ford over St Sunday's Beck, a tributary to the River Bela. Until sometime in the 20th century, there was also a watermill – Halfpenny Mill – in the village, which was by the mid-19th century producing flax, and then coconut matting, paper, and sweet manufacture. Halfpenny is accessible off of the A65.

References 

Hamlets in Cumbria
Stainton, South Lakeland